Blaenrheidol is a community in the county of Ceredigion, North Wales.

It includes the settlements of Ponterwyd, Ystumtuen and Llywernog. As the name suggests, a large section of the Afon Rheidol is in the community as well as the large man-made reservoir of Nant-y-moch.

External links
www.geograph.co.uk : photos of Penterwyd and Blaenrheidol

References

Communities in Ceredigion